Beatlejuice is an American Beatles cover band based in New England. It initially featured Brad Delp, former front-man of the band Boston, on vocals, and has continued with other members since Delp's death in 2007.

Biography
Beatlejuice began in 1994 when John Muzzy and Brad Delp saw Bob Squires' Beatles cover band Merseyside play in Newburyport, Massachusetts, and they decided to start their own band. Beatlejuice played regularly at venues throughout New England until lead singer Brad Delp committed suicide on March 9, 2007, at his home in Atkinson, New Hampshire, at the age of 55.

After Delp's death, the band continued to perform, using the name Beatlejuice and Friends, beginning with memorial concerts for Delp at the Regent Theatre in Arlington, Massachusetts. Some performers include Jimmy Rogers of Velvet Elvis, and Mike Girard of The Fools. Dave Mitchell, the guitarist in the band, works as a guitar teacher in Nashua, New Hampshire. Beatlejuice is occasionally joined onstage by Joe Holaday's sons: Jared, who plays saxophone, and P.J., who plays drums.

Members
Current band members

John "Muzz" Muzzy (drums)
Steve Baker (keyboard, guitar)
Joe Holaday (bass)
Dave Mitchell (guitar)
Jimmy Rogers (vocals)
Buddy Bernard (vocals)
Mike Girard (vocals)
Bob Jennings (vocals)
Evan Gianoulis (percussion)
Rich Bartlett (acoustic guitar)

Past band members
Bob Squires (guitar)
Peter DiStefano (guitar)
Brad Delp (vocals, deceased)

Related bands
 Velvet Elvis: Elvis Presley and 1950s tribute band with Steve Baker and Joe Holaday, Jimmy Rogers, Rich Bartlett, Dave Mitchell and Jeff Maté.
 The Fools: Mike Girard, Rich Bartlett, Lou Spagnola, Joe Holaday, Leo Black, Stacey Pedrick and others, including John "Muzz" Muzzy for a time.
 Boston
 Farrenheit: Charlie Farren, David Hull, and John "Muzz" Muzzy.
 Juice in the Machine: When Boston toured in summer 2003, most of Beatlejuice played in this Police tribute band, with Jimmy Rogers as lead singer.

References

External links
Official site

Musical groups from Massachusetts
Musical groups established in 1994
The Beatles tribute bands
1994 establishments in Massachusetts